Street Anthems is a compilation album by Roll Deep, released on 19 October 2009. It features well-known tracks from 2001 to 2009 and some previously unreleased tracks, showing the early days of grime and Roll Deep, as well as presenting tracks from the early members of Roll Deep such as Dizzee Rascal, Tinchy Stryder, Syer Barz, Trim, Bubbles, Biggie Pitbull etc.

Track listing
 Eskimo (Vocal)
 When I'm 'Ere
 Roll Deep Regular
 Do This Ting
 Bounce
 Babylon Burner
 Heat Up
 Badman
 Shake a Leg
 Eskimo (Remix Vocal)
 Remember the Days
 They Should Know
 Do Me Wrong (featuring Janee)
 U Were Always
 I Will Not Lose
 Celebrate
 Terrible
 Avenue
 Movin' in Circles

Roll Deep members that are on the album
Wiley,
Jet Le,
Breeze,
Skepta,
Flow Dan,
Scratchy,
Brazen,
Manga,
J2K,
Riko

Former members of Roll Deep that are on the album
Dizzee Rascal,
Tinchy Stryder,
Trim,
Biggie Pitbull,
Jamakabi,
Roachee,
Bubbles

2009 compilation albums
Roll Deep albums